Dr. Kari Nadeau is the Chair of the Department of Environmental Health at Harvard School of Public Health and John Rock Professor of Climate and Population Studies.    She practices Allergy, Asthma, Immunology in children and adults. She has published over 400+ papers, many in the field of climate change and health. Dr. Nadeau, with a team of individuals and patients and families, has been able to help major progress and impact in the clinical fields of immunology, infection, asthma and allergy.  Dr. Nadeau is a member of the National Academy of Medicine and the U.S. EPA Children’s Health Protection Committee. 

For more than 30 years, she has devoted herself to understanding how environmental and genetic factors affect the risk of developing allergies and asthma, especially wildfire-induced air pollution. Her laboratory has been studying air pollution and wildfire effects on children and adults, including wildland firefighters.  Many of the health issues involving individuals and the public are increasing because of global warming, sustainability practices, and extreme weather conditions. She oversees a team working on air pollution and wildfire research along with a multidisciplinary group of community leaders, firefighters, engineers, scientists, lawyers, and policy makers.  Dr. Nadeau was appointed as a member of the U.S. Federal Wildfire Commission in 2022. 

Dr. Nadeau works with other organizations and institutes across the world. She is working with the WHO on a scoping review and report for health ministers and policy makers on wildland fires: how to mitigate, adapt, and follow UN SDG’s to create resiliency and co-benefits in communities, especially LMICs.

She also launched four biotech companies, and founded the Climate Change and Health Equity Task Force and started the Sustainability Health Seed Grant initiative and Climate Change and Health Fellowship program at Stanford. She also developed climate change and health courses at Stanford. 
She also has served on the Scientific Advisory Board of the U.S. EPA. 

Dr. Nadeau earned her MD/PhD from Harvard Medical School in 1995, completing her doctoral work in biochemistry and immunology, followed by a pediatric internship and residency at Boston Children’s Hospital (1995-1997). She moved to California for a fellowship in the Stanford-UCSF Allergy, Asthma, and Immunology Program (2003-2006), joining the Stanford Medical School faculty as an instructor, followed by promotions to assistant professor (2008), associate professor (2011), and professor (2015).

Education
After graduating from Haverford College with a degree in biology, Nadeau attended Harvard Medical School via the Medical Scientist Training Program (NIH), and received a PhD in biological chemistry and molecular pharmacology and an MD in 1995.  She then performed an internship and residency in pediatrics at the Children’s Hospital Boston, Harvard Medical School. From 1998 to 2002, she worked in the field of biopharmaceuticals and led clinical research to obtain FDA approval for two biologics in the field of Autoimmunity and Oncology, respectively. From 2003 to 2006, Nadeau was a fellow in Asthma, Allergy and Immunology at the Stanford/UCSF program under Dale Umetsu. During this time, she also did a postdoctoral fellowship in human immune tolerance mechanisms in asthma and allergy.

Career
In 2006, Nadeau was appointed to the Stanford University School of Medicine with appointments in Pediatrics and Otolaryngology. In 2016 she was named the Naddisy Foundation Professor of Pediatric Food Allergy, Immunology and Asthma endowed professorship under the Naddisy Family Foundation.  Nadeau has served as a reviewer for NIH Study Sections, and a member of the American Lung Association Medical Board, CA.  She serves on the Environmental Health Policy committee for the American Thoracic Society and is a Fellow in the American Academy of Allergy, Asthma and Immunology and is a member of ASCI (American Society of Clinical Investigation).  Her laboratory focuses on the study of immunological mechanisms involved in the cause, diagnosis, and therapy for allergy and asthma.  In December, 2014 Sean Parker donated $24 million to Stanford to establish the Sean N. Parker Center for Allergy Research at Stanford University, with Nadeau as the director.

In September 2020, Dr. Kari Nadeau published The End of Food Allergy: The First Program To Prevent and Reverse a 21st Century Epidemic with co-author Sloan Barnett.

As of January 2023, Nadeau is Chair of the Department of Environmental Health at Harvard TH Chan School of Public Health

Research
Nadeau's laboratory is working on scientific investigations of immune tolerance. Areas of research include:

Monitoring T cells in immunotherapy and their effect on tolerance
Translational work (through conducting novel and innovative clinical studies to induce tolerance through immunotherapy) on Treg function and epigenetic changes of pivotal loci in Foxp3 and IL-10, IFN-γ, and IL-4. This research led to novel findings on markers of immune tolerance in a pilot clinical trial using peanut oral immunotherapy for near fatal peanut allergy.

Mechanisms of food allergy immunotherapy
Research focusing on safe and effective treatments for food allergies. A pilot multifood allergen immunotherapy trial demonstrated that oral immunotherapy can simultaneously and successfully achieve desensitization for multiple allergens and that adjunct use of omalizumab facilitates and decreases time to desensitization. A follow-up double-blind, randomized, controlled phase 2 study provided further evidence that in multifood allergic  patients, omalizumab improves  the efficacy of multifood oral immunotherapy and enables safe and rapid desensitization. The data from clinical trials provided initial evidence for the safety and feasibility of oral immunotherapy for food allergies.

T cell epitope use, discovery, and allergen identification
Clinical trials involving participants with multiple food allergies has enabled determination of associations and cross-reactivities of different food allergens. These studies have further assisted with epitope mapping, identification, and characterization of allergenic components of foods that induce clinical reactivity. Data from these studies may, in the future, enable therapeutic targets for food allergies.

Biomarkers and pollution/clinical outcomes
Dedicated, collaborative teams examining plasma, cellular, and epigenetic markers that are affected by air pollution in children, adolescents, and adults. Using well characterized cohorts in the Bay Area (for acute pollution exposure—i.e. wildfire) and in the Central Valley (for chronic exposure—i.e. Fresno is one of the highest ranked cities in the country for PM2.5 air pollution), we have been able to perform innovative and impactful research that has helped shape public policy towards mitigating pollution and its effects on the public, (especially those at risk populations (like children) and the underserved (like Hispanic populations in the Central Valley of California).

Pollution and asthma
A number of environmental pollutants, caused by human activity, have been associated with asthma. Short-term and long-term exposures to high levels of CO, NO2, and PM2.5 mediate epigenetic alterations of Foxp3 and IL-10, key genes known to be associated with T cells and atopic disease. Exposure to polycyclic aromatic hydrocarbons, found at high levels in areas of increased traffic, decrease telomere length.

Honors and awards
 2006 Parker B. Francis Fellowship to Faculty Award
2008 American Academy of Allergy, Asthma, and Immunology (AAAAI) Award for Junior Faculty
2008 McCormick Award, Stanford University School of Medicine
2010 Environmental Protection Agency (EPA) STAR Grant Award 
2010 Elected to Collegium Internationale Allergologicum (CIA)
2014 Distinguished Lecture Award, NIEHS Annual Distinguished Lecture
2015 Elected into American Society of Clinical Investigation (ASCI)
 2018 Chairman, Gordon Research Conference, Food Allergy
2019 Senior Fellow, Stanford Woods Institute for the Environment

Media
Nadeau and her work have made a number of media appearances supporting food allergy awareness and research:
 New York Times, The Allergy Buster
 Katie Couric
 CNN, Funding a cure for food allergies
 NPR, The Doctor Trying To Solve The Mystery Of Food Allergies
 CBS This Morning, Encouraging news for food allergy sufferers
 Huffington Post,
 60 Minutes, Allergy Free
 NBC News, Food Allergy Treatments for Children Show Promise
 Forbes, How Giving Children Foods They Are Allergic To Can Cure Them, And Other Provocative Approaches In Evolutionary Medicine
 PBS Newshour, Retraining the body to lift the life sentence of food allergies
 US News, New Hope for Kids With Multiple Food Allergies
 Stanford Scope, In Stanford clinical trial, children successfully desensitized to food allergens
 CBS Boston, HealthWatch: New Treatment To Help Kids With Multiple Food Allergies
 Allergic Living, Study Finds Combining Xolair with OIT Led to Quicker, Safer Desensitization with Multiple Food Allergens
TEDxPaloAlto, Let's Focus on Food Allergy Prevention
After On podcast, Episode 46 - Dr. Kari Nadeau - Defeating food allergy
Today show, A peanut allergy cure? Big news on new treatments for 6 million kids
Today show, Allergy prevention: The fascinating method parents are turning to.

References 

Year of birth missing (living people)
Living people
Allergologists
Harvard Medical School alumni
Haverford College alumni
American immunologists
American people of French-Canadian descent
American people of Norwegian descent
20th-century American women scientists
21st-century American scientists
21st-century American women scientists
20th-century American physicians
21st-century American physicians
20th-century American women physicians
21st-century American women physicians